The Mauritania national under-17 football team (Arabic: منتخب موريتانيا لكرة القدم تحت 17 سنة) is the national representative for Mauritania in international under-17 football competition, and is controlled by the Football Federation of the Islamic Republic of Mauritania. The team competes in the Africa U-17 Cup of Nations, WAFU Zone A U-17 Tournament, and the FIFA U-17 World Cup, which is held every two years. The under-17 team also participates in local and international friendly tournaments.

Tournament Records

FIFA U-16 and U-17 World Cup record

CAF U-17 Championship record

WAFU Zone A U-17 Tournament

Arab Cup U-17 record

Current squad

See also 
 Mauritania national football team
 Mauritania national under-23 football team
 Mauritania national under-20 football team

External links 
 FFRIM official site

African national under-17 association football teams
under-17